Gundagai Shire was a local government area in the Riverina region of New South Wales, Australia. On 12 May 2016, Gundagai Shire was abolished and merged with the neighbouring Cootamundra Shire to establish Cootamundra-Gundagai Regional Council.

The Shire was located adjacent to the Hume Highway.  Gundagai Shire is primarily rural, with a small population. 80% of the Shire's population live in the town of Gundagai.  The four villages in the Shire were Coolac, Tumblong, Muttama and Nangus, with populations ranging from 40 to 90 people.

The last Mayor of Gundagai Shire was Cr. Abb McAlister, an unaligned politician.

History
Gundagai was declared a Municipality in 1889, and Adjungbilly Shire Council created in 1906 to administer the district. The Municipality of Gundagai and the Adjungbilly Shire were amalgamated on 1 January 1924 to form the Gundagai Shire Council, which was the administrative body of the area.

A 2015 review of local government boundaries recommended that Gundagai Shire merge with adjoining councils. The NSW Government considered two proposals. The alternative, proposed by Harden Shire on 28 February 2016, was for an amalgamation of the Cootamundra, Gundagai and Harden shires. Following an independent review, on 12 May 2016 the Minister for Local Government announced the dissolution of the Cootamunda and Gundagai shires, with their area merging to establish the Gundagai Council. After the merger was gazetted, opposition continued through a Facebook page.

Council 

In 1952 Gundagai Shire Council won a coveted A.R. Bluett Memorial Award for progress.

During 2011 Gundagai Shire Council was one of 110 state and local council authorities where employees were under investigation by the Independent Commission Against Corruption as part of Operation Jarek. It was claimed that employees of some state and local authorities had accepted benefits including gift cards and other items from companies in return for placing orders and continuing business relationships with these companies.

Composition and election method
Gundagai Shire Council was composed of eight councillors elected proportionally from a single ward. All councillors were elected for fixed four-year terms of office. The mayor was elected by the councillors at the first meeting of the council. The last election was held on 8 September 2012, and the makeup of the council was as follows:

The last Council, elected in 2012, in order of election, was:

References

Former local government areas of New South Wales
Local government areas of the Riverina
1924 establishments in Australia
2016 disestablishments in Australia
Hume Highway